In enzymology, a D-aspartate oxidase is an enzyme that catalyzes the chemical reaction

D-aspartate + H2O + O2  oxaloacetate + NH3 + H2O2

The 3 substrates of this enzyme are D-aspartate, H2O, and O2, whereas its 3 products are oxaloacetate, NH3, and H2O2.

This enzyme belongs to the FAD dependent oxidoreductase family, specifically those acting on the CH-NH2 group of donors with oxygen as acceptor. The systematic name of this enzyme class is D-aspartate:oxygen oxidoreductase (deaminating). Other names in common use include aspartic oxidase, and D-aspartic oxidase. This enzyme participates in alanine and aspartate metabolism. It employs one cofactor, FAD.

The enzyme is encoded by DDO gene.

See also

 DAO 
 Diamine oxidase
 D-amino acid oxidase

References

 
 
 

EC 1.4.3
Flavoproteins
Enzymes of unknown structure